Michael Eugene Joseph Jerrick (born July 3, 1950) is a news anchor and a former co-host with Juliet Huddy of the morning program The Morning Show with Mike and Juliet, which began in January, 2007. The last "live" episode of the show aired on June 12, 2009.  He has formerly co-hosted with Huddy DaySide and has both been the co-host and current fill-in host on Fox & Friends on the Fox News Channel. Jerrick now co-hosts Good Day Philadelphia on WTXF.

Life and career
Jerrick was raised in Wichita, and attended Chaplain Kapaun Memorial High School, a Jesuit-run boys' school (now defunct; merged to become Kapaun Mount Carmel Catholic High School). The Wichita native started his career at Topeka's WIBW-TV in Kansas (when colleague Steve Doocy was at WIBW's crosstown rival, KSNT-TV). Jerrick later worked at WNYW in New York as a producer and later host, before moving to San Francisco's KPIX-TV.

During the mid-80s, Jerrick served as co-host for the USA Network afternoon talk show Alive and Well. He also appeared on HBO's World Entertainment Report, before moving to the Sci-Fi Channel's Sci-Fi Buzz and later hosting What's News on America's Talking, a short-lived cable news channel. Soon after, he hosted CNBC's America After Hours, and moved to WTXF as the morning host on Good Day Philadelphia before coming to the Fox News Channel in 2002.

After his daytime talk show, The Morning Show with Mike & Juliet, was cancelled, Jerrick returned to Philadelphia, and now co-hosts Fox 29's Good Day Philadelphia, and occasionally is called back to New York as a substitute on Fox & Friends Weekend.

On Wednesday April 1, 2015, Jerrick announced his candidacy for Mayor of Philadelphia for the 2015 elections. This announcement was made on Good Day Philadelphia, and Jerrick received multiple messages of support; however,  it was subsequently revealed to have been an April Fools' joke.

In January 2017 Jerrick was suspended for a week by Fox 29. On the 23rd Jerrick, co-host Alex Holley and guests were discussing Trump advisor Kellyanne Conway's now infamous 'alternative facts' claim when he said that she was 'good at bullshit'. Holley immediately responded 'We're sorry for that', and Jerrick apologized as well. However, management immediately suspended Jerrick for the rest of the week for using a word considered to be offensive on live television.  He returned to the air on January 30 with an apology to Holley and viewers, who had shown support for him on the station's social media during his absence.

References

External links
 

Living people
Fox News people
American television talk show hosts
People from Hoboken, New Jersey
People from Wichita, Kansas
1950 births